The 39th Assembly District of Wisconsin is one of 99 districts in the Wisconsin State Assembly.  Located in east-central Wisconsin, the district comprises most of Dodge County and part of eastern Columbia County.  It includes the cities of Beaver Dam, Horicon, Juneau, and Mayville, and the villages of Brownsville, Doylestown, Fall River, Hustisford, Iron Ridge, Kekoskee, Lomira, Neosho, and Theresa, and contains the Horicon Marsh State Wildlife Area.  The district is represented by Republican Mark Born, since January 2013.

The 39th Assembly district is located within Wisconsin's 13th Senate district, along with the 37th and 38th Assembly districts.

History
The district was created in the 1972 redistricting act (1971 Wisc. Act 304) which first established the numbered district system, replacing the previous system which allocated districts to specific counties.  The 39th district was drawn with novel boundaries in central Jefferson County.  Under the previous apportionment scheme, Jefferson County as a whole constituted an Assembly district. The last representative of the Jefferson County district, Byron F. Wackett, was elected in 1972 as the first representative of the 39th Assembly district.

Following the 1982 court-ordered redistricting, which scrambled all State Assembly districts, the 1983 redistricting moved the 39th district to Dodge County.  The district has remained in the same area since 1983, with variations in the boundaries.

Notable former representatives of the 39th district include Jeff Fitzgerald, who was the 78th Speaker of the Wisconsin State Assembly, and was instrumental in the passage of the controversial 2011 Wisconsin Act 10, which resulted in months of protests and, eventually, several recall elections.

List of past representatives

References 

Wisconsin State Assembly districts
Dodge County, Wisconsin
Washington County, Wisconsin